Mawlid al-Barzanjī is the popular name of a popular written verse in praise of of the Islamic prophet Muhammad by Jaʿfar b. Ḥasan al-Barzanjī. It's complete title is Iqd al-Jawhar fī Mawlid al-Nabiy al-Azhar (عقد الْجَوهر في مَولِد الْنَبِي الْأزهَر; The Jewelled Necklace of the Resplendent Prophet's Birth) and it was written in the Arabic vernacular.

Mawlid
The work is widely recited by Sunni Muslims around the world. In South East Asia, East Africa and South Africa, the term Barzanji is synonymous with the word Mawlid, which is a celebration of Muhammad. This is done through poetic description of his conception and birth, the miraculous exploits and significant events in his life, and his disposition.

The work has a central place during the annual commemoration of the birth of Muhammad which was on the 12th day of the Islamic month of Rabī al-Awwal. In the Muslim households of Asia and Africa, it is recited to solicit divine blessings on special occasions such as the birth of a child, moving into a new house, and the opening of a new business. It is also recited at death, under the belief that one should rejoice in God’s blessing (i.e. the birth of Muhammad) than to lament a loss (of a loved one). It also serves to remind the believer that no loss is greater than the loss of Muhammad.

Scholarly commentaries
Scholars such as the author’s descendant, Ja’far ibn Ismā’īl al-Barzanjī (d. 1317 AH / 1899 CE) have composed commentaries on the work. Other prominent commentators were Muhammad ‘Ulaysh (d. 1299 AH/1881 CE), the Highest Juridical Authority (Muftī) of the Malikites in Egypt and the Sundanese scholar, Muḥammad Nawawī al-Bantānī (d. 1316 AH/1898 CE), a Shāfi’ī jurist and sūfi who settled in Mecca. The titles of some of the commentaries are as follows:
 al-Barzanji, al-Kawkab al-anwār ‘alā ‘iqd al-jawhar fī mawlid al-nabī al-azhar;
 ‘Ulaysh, al-Qawl al-munjī ‘alā mawlid al-Barzanjī;
 al-Bantānī, Madārij al-ṣu‘ūd ilā iktisā’ al-burūd.

Popular refrain
The work is the source of the popular refrain chanted in Mawlid gatherings around the globe:
عَطِّرِ ٱللّٰهُمَّ قَبْرَہُ ٱلْكَرِيمْ ، بِعَرْفٍ شَذِيٍّ مِنْ صَلاَةٍ وَتَسْلِيْم 
ٱللّٰهُمَّ صَلِّ وَسَلِّمْ وَبَارِكْ عَلَيْهِ وَعَلَى آلِهِ
‘Aṭṭir Allāhumma qabrahu l-karīm / bi-‘arfin shadhiyyin min ṣalātin wa-taslīmAllāhumma ṣalli wa-sallim wa-bārik alaihi wa-‘alā ālihi
O Allāh, perfume his noble grave / with the fragrant scent of blessings and peaceO Allāh, honour, bestow peace, and shower blessings upon him and his family

Contents of Mawlid al-Barzanjī
The contents of the Mawlid al-Barzanjī in English is as follows:
 The Prophet’s Lineage;
 Before His Birth;
 Preternatural Occurrences;
 His Childhood;
 ʿAbd al-Muṭṭalib and Abū Ṭālib;
 Adulthood;
 His Marriage;
 Resolving a Dispute;
 The Beginning of Prophethood:
 The First Believers;
 The Year of Sadness;
 The Night Journey;
 The Prophet Presenting Himself to the Tribes;
 The Emigration;
 The Cave;
 Surāqa;
 The Story of Umm Maʿbad;
 Medina;
 His Inward and Outward Perfection and Beauty;
 The Seal of Prophethood;
 His Love for the Poor;
 Closing Supplication.

References
 

Islamic literature